Ieuan is one of several Welsh forms of the male given name John.

Famous people named Ieuan

Saint Ieuan, 6th-century saint; there is a church dedicated to him in Llantrisant, on the Isle of Anglesey.
Ieuan ab Owain Glyndŵr (c. 1380 – c. 1430), reputed illegitimate son to Owain Glyndŵr, the last native prince of Wales.
Ieuan ap Hywel Swrdwal (c. 1430 – c. 1480), Welsh poet; first recorded Welshman to write an English poem.
Ieuan Gethin ap Ieuan ap Lleision (fl. c. 1450), poet from Glamorgan.
Ieuan Brydydd Hir (fl. 1450 – 1485), poet and singer from Meirionnydd
Ieuan Dyfi (c. 1461? – c. 1500), Welsh poet
Ieuan Gwyllt (1822–1877), bardic name of musician and minister John Roberts.
Ieuan ap Iago (1809–1878), bardic name of Evan James, poet who wrote the lyrics of  the national anthem of Wales, the music of which was by his son James James (Iago ap Ieuan).
Ieuan Williams (1909–64), Welsh cricketer – wicketkeeper for Glamorgan.
Ieuan Rhys Williams (1909–1973), radio and actor.
Ieuan Wyn Pritchard Roberts, Baron Roberts of Conwy, PC (1930–2013), Welsh Conservative politician.
Ieuan Wyn Jones, AM (1949–), former Deputy First Minister for Wales, and leader of Plaid Cymru.
Ieuan Rhys (1961–), television and stage actor.
Ieuan Evans (1964–), former rugby union wing for Wales and the Lions; correspondent for Sky Sports
Ieuan Lloyd (1993–), professional swimmer.
 Ieuan Davies (1995-),

Welsh masculine given names